
Yinzhen usually refers to the name of Yongzheng Emperor (Aisin Gioro Yinzhen).

Yinzhen may also refer to:

Yinzhen Subdistrict (Zunyi) in Zunyi, Guizhou Province.
Yinzhen Subdistrict (Xi'an) in Chang'an District, Xi'an, Shaanxi Province.
Baihao Yinzhen, a white tea
Junshan Yinzhen, a yellow tea
Yinzhen railway station in Yinzhen Subdistrict, Chang'an District, Xi'an, Shaanxi Province